Mohamed Mouigni (born 30 November 1981) is a Comorian footballer who plays as a forward for Élan Club.

Career
In 2009, Mouigni began his career for the Élan Club. He made his international debut for the Comoros national team in 2007.

References

External links

1981 births
Living people
Association football forwards
Comorian footballers
Comoros international footballers
Élan Club de Mitsoudjé players